The Palmdale School District is a school district in Palmdale, California.

History 
The Palmdale School District was formed in 1888.

Schools 
Approximately 18,000 students are enrolled in the Palmdale School District. The district consists of 28 schools:

The Palmdale School District primarily serves kindergarten through the 10th grade.
The current Palmdale School District Superintendent is Raul Maldonado.

All PSD schools are located within Palmdale, California.

Preschools
Early Childhood Education

Elementary schools
Barrel Springs Elementary School
Buena Vista Elementary School
Chaparral Elementary School
Cimarron Elementary School
Desert Rose Elementary School
Golden Poppy Elementary School
Joshua Hills Elementary School
Manzanita Elementary School
Mesquite Elementary School
Ocotillo Elementary School
Palm Tree Elementary School
Quail Valley Elementary School
Summerwind Elementary School
Tamarisk Elementary School
Tumbleweed Elementary School
Yucca Elementary School
Marryot (Roy R.) Elementary School (Defunct Demolished after 1989)

Middle schools
Cactus Magnet Academy
Desert Willow Magnet Magnet Academy
SAGE Magnet Academy
David G. Millen Magnet Academy
Shadow Hills Magnet Academy

International Baccalaureate Schools
Palmdale Learning Plaza

Dual Language Immersion Schools
Los Amigos School
Dos Caminos School

Special Education Schools
Yellen Learning Center
First Steps
Palmdale Discovery Center

Alternative Education Schools
Oak Tree Learning Center
Innovations Academy

Charter schools
Palmdale Academy Charter School

See also

List of school districts in California
Keppel Union School District
Westside Union School District

References

External links
 

Education in Palmdale, California
School districts in Los Angeles County, California
School districts established in 1888
1888 establishments in California